Bostankaya is a village in Ulaş district of Sivas Province. The population of the village is 235 as of 2018.

Population

References

Villages in Ulaş District